Zagreb Hippodrome is a horse racing venue in Zagreb, Croatia. It was built from 1947 to 1950, with a design based on the Longchamp Racecourse in Paris. It is located in the neighbourhood of Kajzerica, on the southern bank of the Sava river, near the Bundek lake. A space for steeplechase races is located in the inside area of the smallest track.

Zagreb Hippodrome has been managed by the Zagreb Equestrian Club since 1952. The most important event at the Hippodrome is the yearly International June Tournament, which has been held since 1955. The venue has been criticised for bad management and track maintenance, and small horse stalls which do not satisfy today's health and safety requirements. The stables hold around 160 horses.

The street where the venue is located was renamed in honour of Radoslav Cimerman, a Croatian horse riding champion who fell from his horse and died in 1974 while training at the Zagreb Hippodrome. In 1994, Pope John Paul II celebrated a mass at the Hippodrome, which was attended by a million people. Pope Benedict XVI also celebrated a mass at the Hippodrome in 2011. The Hippodrome also saw use as a concert venue, hosting Rolling Stones, Iron Maiden, Red Hot Chili Peppers and Metallica.

References

External links 

 International June Tournament official website 
 Zagreb Equestrian Association 

Horse racing venues
1950 establishments in Croatia
Sports venues in Zagreb
Sports venues completed in 1950
Novi Zagreb
Equestrian sports in Croatia